Kellibrooksia is an extinct genus of crustacean in the order Hoplostraca from the Middle Pennsylvanian.

References

Prehistoric Malacostraca
Carboniferous crustaceans
Prehistoric crustacean genera